Salli may refer to:

People

Given name
 Salli Karuna (1902–1987), Finnish film actress
 Salli Richardson (born 1967), American actress and director
 Salli Saffioti (born 1976), American actress
 Salli Setta (born 1965), American restaurateur and businesswoman
 Salli Terri (1922–1996), singer

Surname
 Ebru Şallı, Turkish celebrity
 Edgar Salli, Cameroonian football player
 Janne Salli (born 1977), Finnish football player
 Yousaf Salli, Pakistani socialite

Places
 Salli, Armenia
 Salli, Iran
 Puka Salli, Bolivia
 Q'illu Salli, Bolivia

Astronomy
 Salli family, an asteroid family
 1715 Salli, minor planet

Other
 SALLI, Finnish sex trade union

See also
 Sali (disambiguation)
 Sally (disambiguation)